"Vi sitter i Ventrilo och spelar DotA" (Swedish for "We're sitting in Ventrilo, playing DotA" and shortened to "DotA") is a song by Swedish musician Basshunter which samples a remixed version of the French song "Daddy DJ" by Daddy DJ. The lyrics, in Swedish, are about using the voice chat program Ventrilo while playing Defense of the Ancients, a gamemode within Warcraft III: Reign of Chaos. The song incorporates samples from the game. It was released as the second single from Basshunter's first album LOL.

Release 
An English version of the song called "All I Ever Wanted" was released as the second UK single on 7 July 2008. The second single was originally planned to be "Please Don't Go" but due to some technical issues the single was scrapped in the UK and only released in Sweden. He has also played Warcraft III: The Frozen Throne.

Music video
The video starts out with Basshunter's mother opening a door where it reveals that he and his friends are playing DotA. She tells him that he's playing too much DotA when he starts singing. The video continues showing him playing DotA and later singing at a gamehall live. The clip was not shot during DreamHack, as many believe, but during a similar event called The Gathering, one of the world's largest LAN party events. One of the listeners holds a sign saying "Vadå båt?" (Whaddaya mean boat?) - referring to some listeners' initial confusion of the Swedish lyrics in "Boten Anna", mistaking the word "boten" (the bot) for "båten" (the boat). This could explain the wrong translation in the German version of "Boten Anna" where "Boot" (boat) is sung instead of "Bot" (bot). Another approach is that the person holding the sign is German and wanted to point out the mistake, so Basshunter simply recorded this as a kind of self-parody.

The new video starts with him sitting in a chair, then flipping up a screen on his chair, then selects a video from a little menu floating in the air. Then the videos from there shows more people playing DotA, and several shots of a young woman dancing. He can also be seen playing as the hero Tiny, where he purchases an item, Butterfly. The new video uses the New Single Version mix.

Music video was directed in Malmö by Carl-Johan Westregård and Kim Parrot.

Critical reception 
In 2017 song was included in Monstercat's 50 Best Gaming Songs Ever by Monstercat.

Adaptations 
In 2017 The8BitDrummer recorded a drum cover of "Vi sitter i Ventrilo och spelar DotA".

Track listing
 CD single
 "Vi sitter i Ventrilo och spelar DotA" (Single Version) – 3:21
 "Vi sitter i Ventrilo och spelar DotA" (Club Mix) – 5:43

Charts

Weekly charts

Year-end charts

Certifications

Notes

References

External links
 

2006 songs
2006 singles
Basshunter songs
Dota
Warcraft
Music based on video games
Songs written by David Le Roy
Songs written by Jean Christophe Belval
Warner Music Sweden singles
Swedish-language songs
Song recordings produced by Basshunter